The Ocala Symphony Orchestra, formerly known as the Central Florida Symphony Orchestra and Ocala Festival Orchestra, is a professional per-service orchestra in Ocala, Florida, U.S.A.

The orchestra had its beginning in Ocala, Florida in 1975, when a group of dedicated musicians and public-spirited citizens set about to organize a symphonic orchestra for the area. A four-concert season was initiated that has expanded today into over two dozen performances throughout the year. The Symphony was incorporated on February 17, 1976, and was granted 501 (c) 3 status in August 1977. After a variety of performance venues including a period at the Central Florida Community College, and the Ocala Breeder's Sales Pavilion, the orchestra led a $3.5 million fund-raising campaign to renovate the Ocala City Auditorium into the Reilly Arts Center. The Orchestra continues to manage the venue and in 2020 embarked on a $4.5 million expansion project that will be complete in November 2021.

References

External links
Ocala Symphony Orchestra
Reilly Arts Center

Ocala, Florida
Tourist attractions in Marion County, Florida
Musical groups established in 1975
Orchestras based in Florida